Colonians might refer to:

 Colonia (United States)
 Residents of Cologne